Events in the year 2022 in Iraq.

Incumbents 
 President: Barham Salih
 Prime Minister:
 Mustafa Al-Kadhimi (until 27 October)
 Mohammed Shia' Al Sudani (from 27 October)

Events

January-March 
 21 January: 2022 Diyala massacre
 22 January: January 2022 Hatra airstrike
 13 March: 2022 Erbil missile attacks.

April-June 
 6 April: 2022 Iraqi presidential election
 May: 2022 Sinjar clashes
 June: 2022 Iraqi political crisis

July-September 
 20 July: Zakho resort attack
 29 August: 2022 Baghdad clashes begin
 18 December: 2022 Kirkuk bombing

Weather 
 2022 Iraq dust storms

See also

Country overviews 
 Iraq
 History of Iraq
 History of modern Iraq
 Outline of Iraq
 Government of Iraq
 Politics of Iraq
 Timeline of Iraq history
 Years in Iraq

References 

 
Iraq
Iraq
2020s in Iraq
Years of the 21st century in Iraq